Ezequiel Rodríguez (born 25 March 1996) is an Argentine professional footballer who plays as a forward for Huracán de Chabás.

Career
Rodríguez had youth spells with Academia Griffa, San Telmo de Funes and Rosario Central. He was moved into Rosario Central's first-team in May 2016, he subsequently made his senior debut during a 1–1 draw at home to Quilmes on 15 May. He made one further appearance in the following campaign of 2016–17 against Defensa y Justicia, prior to departing the club on loan in January 2017 to Paraguayan Primera División side Rubio Ñu. Rodríguez made his debut versus Sportivo Trinidense, which turned out to be his one and only appearance for Rubio Ñu. Rodríguez would exit soon after.

After leaving Rosario Central, Rodríguez joined Liga Interprovincial team Huracán de Los Quirquinchos in 2018. He departed but would remain in the regional league for the 2019 campaign, having agreed terms with Alianza de Arteaga. In January 2020, Rodríguez signed for Huracán de Chabás of Liga Casildense.

Career statistics
.

References

External links

1996 births
Living people
Footballers from Rosario, Santa Fe
Argentine footballers
Association football forwards
Argentine expatriate footballers
Expatriate footballers in Paraguay
Argentine expatriate sportspeople in Paraguay
Argentine Primera División players
Paraguayan Primera División players
Rosario Central footballers
Club Rubio Ñu footballers